Topaz Lake is a census-designated place (CDP) in Douglas County, Nevada, United States. The population was 157 at the 2010 census.

Geography
The CDP is located on the northwest shore of Topaz Lake just north of the California border. U.S. Route 395 runs through the community, leading north  to Carson City and south  to Mono Lake in California.

Demographics

References

Census-designated places in Douglas County, Nevada
Census-designated places in Nevada

es:Topaz Lake (Nevada)